The Maybach VL II was a type of internal combustion engine built by the German company Maybach in the late 1920s and 1930s. It was an uprated development of the successful Maybach VL I, and like the VL I, was a 60° V-12 engine.

Five of them powered the German airship Graf Zeppelin, housed in separate nacelles. The engines developed  and were of  capacity. They could burn either Blau gas or petrol. The American USS Akron used eight of them, mounted internally, as did its sister ship Macon. The engines were reversible, meaning different cams could be engaged allowing the engine crankshaft to run in either direction, enabling reverse thrust.

Lürssen built the fast yacht Oheka II in 1927; powered by three VL IIs, it was the fastest vessel of its type and became the basis of Germany's E-boats of World War II.

References

Maybach engines

Airship engines
1920s aircraft piston engines
V12 aircraft engines
V12 engines